This is a list of the mammal species recorded in Malta. There are twenty mammal species in Malta, of which one is critically endangered.

The following tags are used to highlight each species' conservation status as assessed by the International Union for Conservation of Nature:

Order: Erinaceomorpha (hedgehogs and gymnures) 

The order Erinaceomorpha contains a single family, Erinaceidae, which comprise the hedgehogs and gymnures. The hedgehogs are easily recognised by their spines while gymnures look more like large rats.

Family: Erinaceidae (hedgehogs)
Subfamily: Erinaceinae
Genus: Atelerix
 North African hedgehog, A. algirus

Order: Soricomorpha (shrews, moles, and solenodons) 

The "shrew-forms" are insectivorous mammals. The shrews and solenodons closely resemble mice while the moles are stout-bodied burrowers.

Family: Soricidae (shrews)
Subfamily: Crocidurinae
Genus: Crocidura
 Sicilian shrew, Crocidura sicula 
Genus: Suncus
 Etruscan shrew, Suncus etruscus

Order: Chiroptera (bats) 

The bats' most distinguishing feature is that their forelimbs are developed as wings, making them the only mammals capable of flight. Bat species account for about 20% of all mammals.

Family: Vespertilionidae
Subfamily: Myotinae
Genus: Myotis
 Greater mouse-eared bat, Myotis myotis 
 Felten's myotis, Myotis punicus 
Subfamily: Vespertilioninae
Genus: Nyctalus
 Common noctule, Nyctalus noctula 
Genus: Pipistrellus
 Kuhl's pipistrelle, Pipistrellus kuhlii 
 Common pipistrelle, Pipistrellus pipistrellus 
Genus: Plecotus
 Grey long-eared bat, Plecotus austriacus 
Subfamily: Miniopterinae
Genus: Miniopterus
Common bent-wing bat, M. schreibersii 
Family: Rhinolophidae
Subfamily: Rhinolophinae
Genus: Rhinolophus
 Greater horseshoe bat, Rhinolophus ferrumequinum  possibly extirpated
 Lesser horseshoe bat, Rhinolophus hipposideros

Order: Cetacea (whales) 
The order Cetacea includes whales, dolphins and porpoises. They are the mammals most fully adapted to aquatic life with a spindle-shaped nearly hairless body, protected by a thick layer of blubber, and forelimbs and tail modified to provide propulsion underwater.

Suborder: Mysticeti
Family: Balaenopteridae
Genus: Balaenoptera
 Blue whale, Balaenoptera m. musculus  (possible)
 Fin whale, Balaenoptera physalus 
Subfamily: Megapterinae
Genus: Megaptera
 Humpback whale, Megaptera novaeangliae  (possible)
Family: Balaenidae
Genus: Eubalaena
 North Atlantic right whale, Eubalaena glacialis  (possible)
Suborder: Odontoceti
Superfamily:Physeteroidea
Family: Physeteridae (sperm whales)
Genus: Physeter
 Sperm whale, Physeter macrocephalus  
Superfamily: Platanistoidea
Family: Delphinidae (oceanic dolphins)
Genus: Tursiops
 Common bottlenose dolphin, Tursiops truncatus 
Genus: Delphinus
 Short-beaked common dolphin, Delphinus delphis 
Genus: Stenella 
 Striped dolphin, Stenella coeruleoalba 
Genus: Grampus
 Risso's dolphin, Grampus griseus 
Genus: Pseudorca
 False killer whale, Pseudorca crassidens 
Genus: Globicephala
 Long-finned pilot whale, Globicephala melas

Order: Carnivora (carnivorans) 
There are over 260 species of carnivorans, the majority of which feed primarily on meat. They have a characteristic skull shape and dentition.
Suborder: Caniformia
Family: Mustelidae (mustelids)
Genus: Mustela
 Least weasel, M. nivalis  possibly introduced
Family: Phocidae (earless seals)
Genus: Monachus
 Mediterranean monk seal, M. monachus  extirpated

See also
List of chordate orders
Lists of mammals by region
List of prehistoric mammals
Mammal classification
List of mammals described in the 2000s

Notes

References
 

Malta
Mammals
Mammals
Malta